Abd al-Rahim Aqiqi Bakhshayishi (1942 – 5 April 2012) was an Iranian Islamic jurist, religious writer, journalist and translator, widely known for his biographies of Twelver Shia scholars.  Born in Bakhshayesh village of Heris County to an Azeri farmer family. He completed his religious studies in Qom with prominent scholars and graduated from Tehran University in 1971. From religious journalism, he started his independent writing and activities in 1961. A pro-Khomeini during 1979 revolution, Aqiqi was also active in the Islam Da'wah as a Twelver Shia faqih. He died in Qom at the age of seventy and left many works and translations from Arabic to Persian.

Biography 
Abd al-Rahim bin Hatam Aqiqi Bakhshayishi was born in 1942 in the village of Bakhshayesh in the east of Tabriz to an Iranian Azerbaijani farmer family. He decided to leave hometown to Tabriz for further education, and studied elementary and literary courses in Talebiyeh School. In 1958, he went to Qom to continue his studies in Hawza. There he studied with contemporary Ulema, especially Azeris, such as: Ahmad Payani, Yadullah Dozdozani and Ja'far Sobhani. Then he studied higher courses of philosophy, hikmat, Ja'fari jurisprudence and principles from Muhammad Husayn Tabatabai, Morteza Motahhari, Mohammad Bagher Soltani Tabatabai, Ruhollah Khomeini, Mohammad-Reza Golpaygani and Ali Masoumi Hamadani, he who obtained him an Ijazah.

At the same time as he studied in Qom, he also attended the courses of the Faculty of Theology and Islamic Studies of the University of Tehran, field of fiqh and the foundations of Islamic law. He also studied at Dar Tabligh Islami of Mohammad Kazem Shariatmadari in Qom. In 1971, he received a bachelor's degree from Tehran University, and an academic thesis from Dar Tabligh. 

After graduating and becoming a Jafa'ri faqih, he turned to writing. From 1961 he started writing on religious topics in the Persian-language newspapers of that time, such as Neday-e Haq, Wazifeh and Noor Danesh magazine, and wrote his first book in the same year. In 1971, he was selected as a member of the editorial board of the first Iranian Islamic magazine in Qom, Maktab'e Eslam and published various articles. In journalism, he is famous for being the author of the first reporter of Khomeini's media presence in 1962. This report was prepared in 13 Rajab 1382 A.H. / 10  December 1962, about a meeting between Khomeini and the then prime minister, Ali Amini. 

After the 1979 Iranian revolution, he taught in various colleges for about 12 years; including Islamic Azad University and University of Tehran. He was a member of the faculty of Tehran University and a teacher of Islamic education courses, and obtained a doctorate degree from Azerbaijan National Academy of Sciences in 1991. Aqiqi Bakhshiishi also partipicated in religious charity and civil fields of Shiite holy places in Iran, Azerbaijan and Syria. In 1994, he established a religious publication house in Qom called Navid-e Islam (or Navīd-i Islām).  He was also active  in dawah for the Twelver Shi'ism as a pro-Islamic Republican and believer to Wilayat-e Faqih,  domestic and foreign.

Aqiqi died at the age of 68 on the morning of 5 April 2012 in Qom after enduring a period of more than a year of illness.

Personal life 
His daughter  (born 1968) is a calligraphic artist.

Works 
In addition to writing, he also translated from Arabic to Farsi  many works, such as: Quran, Nahj al-Balagha, Sahifa al-Sajjadiyya, Al-Amali,  Makarim al-Akhlaq by al-Tabarsi, Al-Bab al-hadi ashar by al-Hilli, Kanz al-ʻirfān fī fiqh al-Qurʼān by al-Fadil al-Miqdad, Rawz̤at al-shuhadāʼ by Husayn Kashifi etc. Bakhshayishi wrote more than 50 books on various topics of the Twelver Shi'ism, especially biography, among them:
 , 1974
 , 1979
 , series, 1979-1990
 , 1982
 , 1982
 , 1981
/ , 1982
 , 1980
 , 1984
 , 1985
 , 1991
 , 1992
 , 1992
 , 1995-1996
 , 1998
 , 1999
 , 1999
 , 2000
 , 2002
 , 2003
 , 2003
 , 2010
 , 2010 
 ,
 ,
 ,
 ,
 ,
 ,
 ,
 ,
 ,
 ,

References 

Faculty of Theology and Islamic Studies of the University of Tehran alumni
1942 births
2012 deaths
Iranian religious writers
Iranian translators
Arabic–Persian translators
Iranian essayists
Translators of the Quran into Persian
Academic staff of the University of Tehran
Iranian Azerbaijanis
People from East Azerbaijan Province
Iranian biographers
Iranian book publishers (people)
Religious biographers
Academic staff of the Islamic Azad University